Events from the year 1858 in Germany.

Incumbents
 King of Bavaria – Maximilian II
 King of Hanover – George V
 King of Prussia – Frederick William IV
 King of Saxony – John of Saxony

Events 
 William I of Prussia becomes regent for his brother, Frederick William IV, who has suffered a stroke.
 January 25 – The Wedding March by Felix Mendelssohn becomes a popular wedding recessional, after it is played on this day at the marriage of Queen Victoria 's daughter Victoria, Princess Royal , to Prince Friedrich of Prussia in St James's Palace , London.

Births 

 January 10 – Heinrich Zille, German illustrator, photographer (d. 1929)
 February 18 – Wilhelm Schmidt, German pioneer of superheated steam for use in locomotives (d. 1924 )
 February 24 - Friedrich Schrempf, German editor, politician (d. 1913)
 March 18 – Rudolf Diesel, German inventor, automotive pioneer (d. 1913)
 March 23 – Ludwig Quidde, German pacifist, recipient of the Nobel Peace Prize (d. 1941)
 March 27 – Richard Friedrich Johannes Pfeiffer, German physician, bacteriologist (d. 1945)
 April 23 – Max Planck, German physicist, Nobel Prize laureate (d. 1947)
 July 9 – Franz Boas, German anthropologist (d. 1942)
 November 10 – Heinrich XXVII, Prince Reuss Younger Line (d. 1928)
 December 19 – Adolf Schiel, German-born officer in Boer armed forces (d. 1903)

Deaths 
 February 13 – Hermann Heinrich Gossen, economist (b. 1810)
 March 20 – Johannes Gossner, theologian and philanthropist (b. 1810)
 June 3 – Julius Reubke, German composer (b. 1834)
 December 13 – Karl Ludwig Philipp Zeyher, German botanist (b. 1799 )

References 

Years of the 19th century in Germany
Germany
Germany